Emmi Parviainen (born 8 November 1985 in Hämeenlinna) is a Finnish actress. From 2004 - 2007 she had a supporting role in the popular Finnish soap opera Salatut Elämät, Concealed Lives, playing the character Annika Sievinen.

References 

1985 births
Living people
Finnish actresses
Finnish women musicians
People from Hämeenlinna